Hoplocorypha nigerica is a species of praying mantis found in western Africa (Burkina Faso, Ghana, and Nigeria).

See also
List of mantis genera and species

References

Hoplocorypha
Mantodea of Africa
Insects described in 1930